The City Council of Penang Island is the council that administers the city of Pulau Pinang, which includes the entirety of Penang Island, Malaysia.

The City Council of Penang Island is responsible for urban planning, heritage preservation, public health, sanitation, waste management, traffic management, environmental protection, building control, social and economic development, and general maintenance of urban infrastructure. In addition, the city council, in a joint effort with Rapid Penang, runs a free shuttle bus service within the heart of George Town.

The headquarters of the council is located within the City Hall in George Town, which had served as the seat of the George Town City Council until 1976. The council also has offices within Komtar, the tallest skyscraper in George Town.

History

A committee of assessors for George Town was established in 1800, making it the first local government to be established within British Malaya. The committee, which consisted of British and local Asian ratepayers, was tasked with the valuation of property within the new settlement.

In 1857, the George Town Municipal Commission was officially established. It consisted of five members and was led by the Resident-Councillor of Penang. Three of the Municipal Commissioners were to be elected by expatriate ratepayers and Straits-born British citizens, making the Municipal Commission the first, albeit partially, elected local government within British Malaya. However, the local elections were abolished by 1913.

In 1951, the British colonial authorities reintroduced municipal elections of nine of the fifteen municipal commissioners for George Town, the first municipal council in Malaya to do so. For the municipal elections, George Town was divided into three wards - Tanjung, Kelawei and Jelutong. By 1956, George Town became the first municipality in Malaya to have a fully elected local government. Five wards were created to elect one councillor each year, while the President of the Municipal Council was voted from amongst the councillors.

On 1 January 1957, George Town became a city by a royal charter granted by Queen Elizabeth II, becoming the first city in the Federation of Malaya, and by extension, Malaysia. George Town remained Malaysia's only city (other than Singapore between 1963 and 1965) until 1972, when Kuala Lumpur was also granted city status. The first Mayor of George Town was D. S. Ramanathan, a Labour Party politician.

In 1965, the Malaysian federal government suspended local elections as a result of the Indonesian Confrontation. The George Town City Council was at the time the richest local council in the country, with annual revenue almost double that of the Penang state government. In response to allegations of maladministration and misconduct, a Royal Commission of Enquiry was set up by the federal government under Senator Athi Nahappan, while the functions of the City Council were temporarily transferred to the Chief Minister of Penang in 1966.

The Royal Commission cleared the George Town City Council of the allegations of corruption and recommended the restoration of municipal elections. However, this was never carried out. Instead, in 1971, the two local councils on Penang Island - the George Town City Council and the Penang Island Rural District Council, the latter of which administered the rural southwest of Penang Island - were taken over by the Penang state government. In addition, the state government, controlled at the time by Gerakan and led by Lim Chong Eu as the Chief Minister, also decided to continue the suspension of Penang's local governments.

In 1974, both the George Town City Council and the Penang Island Rural District Council were merged to form the Penang Island Municipal Council. This act also resulted in the consolidation of Penang's local governments into two local governments, each administering one halve of the state - Penang Island and Seberang Perai.

Controversy over city status
George Town's royal charter provided that:

"... the said Municipality of George Town shall on the First Day of January in the year of Our Lord One thousand nine hundred and fifty seven and forever thereafter be a city and shall be called and styled the CITY OF GEORGE TOWN instead of the Municipality of George Town and shall thenceforth have all such rank, liberties, privileges and immunities as are incident to a City."

With the legal entity for George Town being superseded by the merger of the local governments in 1974, the Malaysian federal government was of the view that George Town no longer existed as a city. The city of George Town was omitted in federal government publications and maps.

Despite this, most citizens of Penang contend that George Town is still a city to this day, as George Town's city status was technically never revoked. Several federal and municipal ordinances and by-laws still in use today refer to the City of George Town, such as the City of George Town Ordinance 1957 and the City of George Town Liquefied Petroleum Gases By-Laws 1971. According to Penang Heritage Trust (PHT) trustee, Anwar Fazal, a lawyer by profession, George Town "legally has been and is still a city because the City of George Town Ordinance 1957 was never repealed".

In addition, Clause 3 of the Local Government (Merger of the City Council of George Town and the Rural District Council of Penang Island) Order 1974, which was sanctioned by the then Penang state government, stated that"... the status of the City of George Town as a city shall continue to be preserved and maintained and shall remain unimpaired by the merger hereby effected."The clause above implies that, although the legal entity for George Town had been superseded, George Town's city status remains intact and unchanged by the merger of the local governments.

In 2008, the newly-elected Penang state government, announced that they would revive the commemorations of George Town's city status from 1 January 2009.

Expansion of city limit 
In 2015, the Malaysian federal government elevated the Penang Island Municipal Council into the present-day Penang Island City Council. This also makes George Town the only city in Malaysia to be conferred city status twice, first by Queen Elizabeth II, and then by the Malaysian federal government. Patahiyah binti Ismail was subsequently installed as the Mayor of Penang Island, the first female Mayor in Penang's history.

List of mayors

Mayors of George Town

Mayors of Penang Island

Organisation 
The City Council is headed by the Mayor of Penang Island, who is assisted by the City Secretary and 24 councillors. The Mayor's term lasts for two years, while each of the 24 councillors is appointed for a one-year term by the Penang state government.

20 of the councillors are selected by the component parties of the ruling Pakatan Harapan coalition. Of these, nine are appointed by the Democratic Action Party (DAP), seven by the People's Justice Party (PKR), and two each from the National Trust Party (Amanah) and Malaysian United Indigenous Party (Bersatu). Penang-based non-governmental organisations (NGOs) are allocated the remaining four councillor posts to allow for the participation in policy-making by Penang's civil societies.

The current Mayor of Penang Island is Yew Tung Seang, who assumed office in 2018, whilst IR.RAJENDRAN A/L P. ANTHONY holds the position of the City Secretary.

Councillors 
, the councillors of the Penang Island City Council are as listed below.

Departments 
The City Council also comprises the following departments.

See also
 Mayor of Penang Island
 George Town
 Penang Island
 Seberang Perai City Council

References

External links
 MBPP official website 
 https://idirektori.penang.gov.my/papar_ketuajab.php?idj=12&agency=3

Pulau Pinang
City councils in Malaysia
George Town, Penang
Penang Island